This is the list of states by the date of adoption of the Reformation, meaning the date of an official conversion of a ruler or that of making a Protestant confession an official state religion. The list is incomplete due to the persisting feudalistic nature of many states in the early modern Europe.

The Reformation began in 1517 but did not receive formal state support until 1525, although some imperial cities, like Strassburg, introduced it in 1524. The city council of Strassburg eventually came to support the Reformed tradition with reformers like Martin Bucer, Matthew Zell, Wolfgang Capito and Caspar Hedio.

Duchy of Prussia and some other states in the Holy Roman Empire introduced Lutheranism as early as 1525. Depending on the view, Luther's country (the Electoral Saxony) adopted the confession either in 1525 (elector becomes Lutheran) or 1527 (Lutheranism is made a state religion).

Pre-Reformation
As a result of the Bohemian Reformation, Western Christianity was already compromised in the Lands of the Bohemian Crown for decades before Luther. An Utraquist Hussite confession was dominant since the early 1420s and also formally permitted, alongside the Catholic Church, since the Basel Compacts (1436/7) and definitively since the Religious peace of Kutná Hora (1485). George of Poděbrady was the first non-Roman Catholic ruler in the Catholic part of the early modern Europe. He ruled over Bohemia during 1458–1471.

Lands of the Bohemian Crown (1436/7, 1485)
Kingdom of Bohemia
Margraviate of Moravia
occasionally Silesia and Lusatia

By year

1524
Strassburg
Nuremberg

1525
Anhalt-Köthen
Duchy of Prussia
Principality of Ansbach
Duchy of Brunswick-Lüneburg
County of Mansfeld-Mittelort
County of Mansfeld-Hinterort

1526
Landgraviate of Hesse
Anhalt-Bernburg

1527
Electoral Saxony
Principality of Lüneburg
Sweden

1528
Bern

1529
Basel
Hamburg

1530
Ulm
Frankfurt am Main

1531
Lübeck

1534
England
Duchy of Württemberg
Duchy of Pomerania

1536
Denmark-Norway
Geneva
Lausanne

1539
Margraviate of Brandenburg

1542
Duchy of Schleswig
Duchy of Holstein

1549
Mecklenburg

1556
Baden-Durlach

1557
Electoral Palatinate

1559
County of Schaumburg

1560
Scotland

1575
Aalen

1579
Dutch Republic

1581
Aachen

1610
County of Mansfeld-Vorderort

Protestant Reformation